Meates is the surname of the following people:
Bill Meates (rugby union) (1923–2003), New Zealand rugby union player
William Meates (1875–1910), English football goalkeeper
Kevin Meates (born 1930), New Zealand rugby union player
Roly Meates, Ireland national rugby union team coach
Liam Meates, Irish artist

See also
Meates v Attorney-General, a 1983 court case in New Zealand